Helcogramma rhinoceros, known commonly as the rhinocerus triplefin or the rhino threefin, is a species of triplefin blenny in the genus Helcogramma. It was described by P.E. Hadley Hansen in 1986. This species is found throughout the Indo-Pacific from Thailand to Fiji and Tonga.

References

Rhinocerus triplefin
Fish described in 1986